S.B.S. Government College, Hili, established in 2015, is the government degree college in the border area of  Hili,  Dakshin Dinajpur district. It offers undergraduate courses in science and arts. It is affiliated to University of Gour Banga.

Departments

Science

Chemistry
Zoology
Botany

Arts

Bengali
English
Sanskrit
History
Philosophy

See also

References

External links
S.B.S. Government College, Hili
University of Gour Banga
University Grants Commission
National Assessment and Accreditation Council

Universities and colleges in Dakshin Dinajpur district
Colleges affiliated to University of Gour Banga
Educational institutions established in 2015
2015 establishments in West Bengal
Government colleges in West Bengal